Eunidia kivuana is a species of beetle in the family Cerambycidae. It was described by Stephan von Breuning in 1952.

Subspecies
 Eunidia kivuana kivuana Breuning, 1952
 Eunidia kivuana tanzanicola Téocchi, 1998

References

Eunidiini
Beetles described in 1952